Aegilops juvenalis (syn. Aegilops turcomanica Roshev., Triticum juvenale Thell.) is a species in the family Poaceae.

External links
Aegilops juvenalis
GrainGenes Species Report: Aegilops juvenalis

juvenalis
Flora of Western Asia